Pseudomicronia is a genus of moths in the family Uraniidae.

Description
Palpi short, porrect and not very slender. Antennae thickened and flattened. Mid tibia with one pair of spurs, hind tibia with two pairs. Forewing with costa slightly arched. The apex rounded, the outer margin straight. Veins 2 and 3 from a point before end of cell. Veins 6 and 7 stalked. Veins 8 to 10 stalked. Hindwing with an angled tail at vein 4 and veins 3,4 from cell.

Species
Some species of this genus are:
Pseudomicronia advocataria (Walker, 1861) (India, Taiwan, China, Philippines, Borneo)
Pseudomicronia archilis (Oberthür, 1891)
Pseudomicronia bundutuhan Holloway, 1998 (Borneo)
Pseudomicronia charassozona West, 1932
Pseudomicronia fraterna Moore, 1887 (Sri Lanka)
Pseudomicronia oppositana Snellen
Pseudomicronia unimacula Warren
Pseudomicronia tibetana Bytinski-Salz, 1939 (Tibet)

References

Moore, 1887 . The Lepidoptera of Ceylon 3: 461

Uraniidae